Lieutenant-Colonel Henry Shakespear Thuillier  (10 September 1895 – 1982) was a British Army officer.

Early life and family
Thuillier was born at Murree, Punjab, India, the son of Major General Sir Henry Fleetwood Thuillier and Helen Thuillier (died 1923), eldest daughter of Major-General G.R. Shakespear of the Indian Army.

Death
Thuillier died in Victoria, BC, Canada in 1982.

Selected publications
Cosmos Without End. Vantage Press, 1975.
That which was. H.S. Thuillier, Victoria, B.C., 1977.

References 

1895 births
1982 deaths
Royal Garrison Artillery officers
Companions of the Distinguished Service Order
Henry Shakespear
People from Murree
Royal Artillery officers
Graduates of the Royal Military Academy, Woolwich
British Army personnel of World War I
British Army personnel of World War II
British people in colonial India
Military personnel of British India